"Chocolate (Choco Choco)" is the debut single by German pop duo Soul Control, released in 2004 from their debut album Here We Go. The song was written and produced by Bruce Hammond Earlam and Ned Irving. The refrain interpolates parts of "La Bamba".

A "New Mixes" maxi CD with multilingual remixes was also released which included versions in Spanish, French and German to increase the song's appeal. The song was a top 5 hit in Germany, Austria and Switzerland and also made number 25 on the UK Singles Chart. In 2007, a Japanese version was released under the title "Oideyo Goringo" (おいでよゴリンゴ) and was the main theme of the FujiTV production Ponkikki.

Tracklist
CD-maxi single
"Chocolate (Choco Choco)" (Single Version) - 3:16	
"Chocolate (Choco Choco)" (Extended Version) - 4:06	
"Chocolate (Choco Choco)" (Soul Control Having Fun with Ersin & Börek) - 3:23	
"Chocolate (Choco Choco)" (Sexy Dance Mix) - 4:18	
"Fiesta" - 3:26	
 		 	 
New Mixes 	
"Chocolate (Choco Choco)" (Have a Good Time Mix) - 3:17	
"Chocolate (Choco Choco)" (Spanish Version) - 3:16	
"Chocolate (Choco Choco)" (French Version) - 3:17	
"Chocolate (Choco Choco)" (Oktoberfest Mix) - 3:37	
"Chocolate (Choco Choco)" (Karaoke Version) - 3:17	
"Chocolate (Choco Choco)" (Instrumental) - 3:16

"Oideyo Goringo"
 おいでよゴリンゴ (日本語ラップVer.) / OIDEYO GORINGO (NIHONGO RAP VER.)
 おいでよゴリンゴ (英語ラップ Ver.1) / OIDEYO GORINGO (EIGO RAP VER.1)
 おいでよゴリンゴ (英語ラップ Ver.2) / OIDEYO GORINGO (EIGO RAP VER.2)
 おいでよ ゴリンゴ  (インスト) / OIDEYO GORINGO (INST)
 おいでよ ゴリンゴ (ユーロビート・リミックス) / OIDEYO GORINGO (EUROBEAT REMIX)
 おいでよ ゴリンゴ (アニメーション Ver.) (Video)
 おいでよ ゴリンゴ (振り付けダンスver.) (Video)

Charts

References

2004 songs
2004 debut singles
Bertelsmann Music Group singles
English-language German songs